Francisco Valero (29 May 1906 – 15 September 1982) was a Mexican épée and sabre fencer. He competed at the 1932 and 1948 Summer Olympics.

References

External links
 

1906 births
1982 deaths
Mexican male épée fencers
Olympic fencers of Mexico
Fencers at the 1932 Summer Olympics
Fencers at the 1948 Summer Olympics
Sportspeople from Saltillo
Mexican male sabre fencers
20th-century Mexican people